Pseudorthodes is a genus of moths of the family Noctuidae.

Species
 Pseudorthodes angustimargo (Dyar, 1910)
 Pseudorthodes ignescens (Schaus, 1903)
 Pseudorthodes iole (Schaus, 1894)
 Pseudorthodes irrorata (Smith, 1888)
 Pseudorthodes keela (Smith, 1908)
 Pseudorthodes puerilis (Grote, 1874)
 Pseudorthodes vecors (Guenée, 1852) (=Pseudorthodes imora (Strecker, 1898), Pseudorthodes calceolaris (Strecker, 1900))
 Pseudorthodes virgula (Grote, 1883)

References
Natural History Museum Lepidoptera genus database
Pseudorthodes at funet

Hadeninae